George J. Alden (fl. 1860s) was a Florida state senator who became the Florida Secretary of State in 1868. He was involved in a dispute over who was governor when efforts were made to replace Harrison Reed. One account described Alden as "a controversial debt ridden secretary of state... who absconded to Jacksonville with the Great Seal of Florida and used it to try to help Osborn try to impeach Gov. Reed". He was subsequently ousted from office and succeeded by Jonathan Clarkson Gibbs, an African American.

References

Year of birth unknown
19th-century American politicians
Year of death unknown
Florida state senators
Secretaries of State of Florida